The  was the name of several Japanese clans, of varying origin.

Hayashi clan (Owari) of Owari Province (a branch of the Inaba clan)
Hayashi clan (Confucian scholars) of Confucian scholars (founded by Hayashi Razan, came to prominence in the early Edo period, scholarly advisors to Tokugawa Ieyasu)
Hayashi clan (Jōzai) of the Jōzai Domain (descended from the Ogasawara clan)